Ovidiu George Sterian (born 8 March 2004) is a Romanian professional footballer who plays as a centre back for Liga III side SR Brașov.

References

External links
 
 Ovidiu Sterian at frf-ajf.ro

2004 births
Living people
People from Brașov County
Romanian footballers
Association football defenders
Liga I players
Liga III players
LPS HD Clinceni players
SR Brașov players